Eluru railway station (station code:EE) is an Indian Railways station in Eluru city of Andhra Pradesh. It lies on the Howrah–Chennai main line and is administered under Vijayawada railway division of South Coast Railway zone (formerly South Central Railway zone).

History 
The southern part of the East Coast State Railway (from Waltair to Vijayawada) was taken over by Madras Railway in 1901.

Electrification 
The Mustabad–Gannavaram–Nuzvid–Bhimadolu sector was electrified in 1995–96.

Classification 
In terms of earnings and outward passengers handled, Eluru is categorized as a Non-Suburban Grade-3 (NSG-3) railway station. Based on the re–categorization of Indian Railway stations for the period of 2017–18 and 2022–23, an NSG–3 category station earns between – crore and handles  passengers.

Structure and amenities 

The station has 03 platforms and all the tracks are broad gauge and electrified. Almost all platforms are in same size. The station has East and West terminals equipped with reservation counters. It was 37th cleanest station in 'A'-Category, as of 2018. It is one of the 38 stations in the division to be equipped with Automatic Ticket Vending Machines (ATVMs).

Satellite stations 
Eluru city consists of four other railway stations. These are:

References

External links 

South Central Railway

Railway stations in West Godavari district
Vijayawada railway division
Railway stations in Eluru
1893 establishments in India